The 1974–75 Eintracht Frankfurt season was the 75th season in the club's football history. In 1974–75 the club played in the Bundesliga, the top tier of German football. It was the club's 12th season in the Bundesliga.

Within the season Eintracht won DFB Cup twice. The first time it was the 1973–74 campaign. That cup final was held in the beginning of season because of the 1974 World Cup in West Germany. The club repeated the cup victory and won the trophy at the end of the season. It was the first and second cup victory respectively.

Matches

Legend

Friendlies

Bundesliga

League fixtures and results

League table

DFB-Pokal

1973–74

Final

1974–75

Final

European Cup Winners' Cup

Squad

Squad and statistics

|}

Notes

References

Sources

External links
 Official English Eintracht website 
 German archive site
 1974–75 Bundesliga season at Fussballdaten.de 

1974-75
German football clubs 1974–75 season